Samuel Herbert Morris (23 October 1886 – December 1969) was an English professional footballer who played in the Football League for Brentford as a wing half.

Club career

Early years 
Morris joined First Division club Aston Villa in 1906, but failed to make an appearance before departing the club at the end of the 1906–07 season. He moved to Southern League First Division club Queens Park Rangers in 1908. He remained at Loftus Road until joining divisional rivals Bristol Rovers in 1911, after a short spell with Second Division club Birmingham. Morris remained with Rovers during the First World War and left the club after the armistice, in 1919.

Brentford 
Morris signed for Southern League First Division club Brentford in 1919, after having guested for the club during the war. He made 37 appearances during what would be the club's final season of Southern League football and was kept on for the club's debut Football League season. Morris had to wait until 9 October 1920 to make his Football League debut, which came in a 0–0 draw with Norwich City. He made 27 appearances during the 1920-21 season and departed Griffin Park in May 1921, having made 64 appearances for the Bees.

Maidstone United 
After leaving Brentford, Morris dropped into non-League football to join Kent League club Maidstone United.

Personal life 

Morris served as a sergeant in the Middlesex Regiment's Football Battalion during the First World War. He was a motor car machinist by trade and later worked in Paddington as an ice rink foreman and ice skate grinder.

Career statistics

References 

1886 births
Footballers from Birmingham, West Midlands
English footballers
Brentford F.C. players
English Football League players
Queens Park Rangers F.C. players
Aston Villa F.C. players
Maidstone United F.C. (1897) players
Association football wing halves
Bristol Rovers F.C. players
Military personnel from Staffordshire
Southern Football League players
1969 deaths
Birmingham City F.C. players
British Army personnel of World War I
Middlesex Regiment soldiers
Brentford F.C. wartime guest players
Footballers from Handsworth, West Midlands
Clapton Orient F.C. wartime guest players
Date of death unknown
Kent Football League (1894–1959) players